Stars on Ice is a touring figure skating show produced by IMG.  It was co-founded in 1986 by Bob Kain, IMG executive, and Scott Hamilton, the 1984 Olympic Gold Medalist in men's figure skating.  The production is a theatrical show featuring a small cast of elite skaters who perform together in ensemble as well as solo numbers.  Hamilton retired from regular touring in 2001.

Stars on Ice was originally conceived as an ice show for adults, without the children's cartoon characters typical of other commercial ice shows of the period such as Ice Capades or Disney on Ice.  It started on a shoestring budget, playing only a few dates in small-town arenas.  The first national tour was conducted in 1987-88.  In 1992, IMG bought out the rival "Skating" tour from Bill Graham Presents and merged its resources with those of Stars on Ice.  Among the acquisitions from the "Skating" tour was Sandra Bezic, who took over as Director and Choreographer of Stars on Ice for over a decade.  For the past two years, Jeffrey Buttle has served as director.  In its history, Stars on Ice has won three Emmy Awards and the 1994 ACE Cable Award for Best Sports Special.

Stars on Ice tours the United States, Canada, Japan and China on an annual basis, and has also staged shows in Europe, Brazil, and Korea. The Tour has played over 1,600 shows in its 32 seasons.

Historical timeline

 October, 1986: Scott Hamilton ‘America’ Tour debuts, starting in Orono, ME and travels to Burlington, VT; Durham, NH; Morristown, NJ; and Philadelphia, PA. 
 December, 1986: Stars on Ice hits the road headlining Scott Hamilton and Rosalynn Sumners.  Scheduled cities were medium-size and primarily located in the East and Midwest. 
 1987-1988 Tour:  Discover Card becomes the title sponsor with Plymouth as the presenting sponsor.  The Tour plays 36 shows in its first full season.
 1987: ESPN televises first show from Chicago.
 1988-1989 Tour: 1988 Olympic Medalists Brian Orser, Debi Thomas, and Tracy Wilson & Rob McCall join the tour.
 1989: Kitty and Peter Carruthers join the tour which further increases the versatility of the tour.
 1990: Canada becomes part of the Stars on Ice schedule.
 September, 1991: Former Cast Member Rob McCall dies from AIDS.
 1991-1992 Tour: The baseball number provides the impetus for the wonderful, full-cast ensemble productions that would follow.
 1992: Two major performances televised by Turner Broadcasting and NBC.  The Tour will win three Emmy Awards and one ACE Cable award for its television productions in the years to come.
 1992: World Champion Kurt Browning becomes the first major amateur skater on the Stars on Ice Tour as he headlines the Canadian Tour.
 1992: (April 28) Former cast member Brian James Pockar, Canadian figure skater, dies in Calgary of AIDS.
 1992-1993: Olympic Gold Medalist Kristi Yamaguchi joins the Tour. Sandra Bezic is hired as Director/Choreographer.
 February 19, 1993: The show’s first appearance at Madison Square Garden.
 1994: Scott, Brian, Rosalynn, Kitty, and Peter lead a tribute to the ’84 Olympics in Sarajevo. 
 1994:  Katarina Witt joins Stars on Ice; Kurt Browning expands his participation to the U.S. Tour.
 1994-1995 Tour:  The return of Gordeeva & Grinkov following their second Olympic Gold in Lillehammer; cast features total of six Olympic Gold Medals.
 November 20, 1995: Sergei Grinkov collapses and dies of a heart attack at SOI rehearsals.
 February 27, 1996:  Stars on Ice presents Celebration of a Life, a prime time CBS special featuring the return to the ice of Ekaterina Gordeeva.
 1996-1997 Tour: Jayne Torvill & Christopher Dean join the Tour. Ekaterina Gordeeva tours as a solo skater.  Smucker’s becomes the presenting sponsor of the Tour.
 March, 1997:  Scott Hamilton is diagnosed with testicular cancer.
 1997-98 Tour: Scott Hamilton returns to the ice to perform in Stars on Ice.  Stars on Ice gets a private jet that helps to relieve travel difficulties.
 1998:  Tara Lipinski and Ilia Kulik, fresh off Olympic Gold in Nagano, Japan, join the Tour. Target becomes Title Sponsor.
 2000-01 Tour: Scott Hamilton Farewell Tour.
 2001-02 Tour "Gold":  Smucker’s becomes Title Sponsor.
 2002:  Alexei Yagudin and the Golden Pairs (Sale & Pelletier and Berezhnaya & Sikharulidze) join the cast.
 2003-04 Tour "Time – A Theatrical Adventure"
 2004-05 Tour "Imagination – It’s all You Need to Dream"
 2005-06 Tour: 20th Anniversary Season.
 2006-07 Tour "Double Exposure – The Many Lives of Figure Skaters" 
 2007-08 Tour "Live and in Color": Olympic Silver Medalist Sasha Cohen joins the Tour. Tour plays one month in Japan.  1,000th U.S.Stars on Ice performance on March 13, 2008, in Philadelphia.
 2008-09 Tour "On the Edge – The Heart of the Champion"
 2010 Tour "The Concert": After winning an Olympic Gold Medal in Vancouver,  Evan Lysacek performs in 26 shows while competing in ABC's Dancing With The Stars throughout the tour.  The Canadian Tour sells out multiple shows.
 2010-11 Tour: Stars on Ice celebrates 25th Anniversary Tour in 25 U.S. markets.
 2011-12 Tour "Love ‘n’ Life": Stars on Ice produces show for 10th anniversary of Salt Lake City Olympics featuring SLOC President and CEO, Mitt Romney.
 2012-13 Tour: Dorothy Hamill joins to perform in Kurt Browning's final U.S. Tour.  250th Canadian performance on May 3, 2013 in Saskatoon, SK.
2014 Tour: Olympic Gold Medalists Meryl Davis & Charlie White headline the U.S. Tour.  The Canadian cast features the Olympic Silver Medal-winning team, Tessa Virtue & Scott Moir, from the Sochi Olympics.
2014-15 Tour: 25th Anniversary Tour of Canada.
2016 Tour: "#E-motion" features medalists from 2016 World Championships in Boston.
2017 Tour: "In dreams" Canadian tour features Kurt Browning, Elvis Stojko, and Patrick Chan touring together for the first time.
2018 Tour: "Celebration" World Champion Nathan Chen leads U.S. tour; Canadian tour features entire Olympic Gold-Medal winning team and sells out across the country.
2019 Tour: "Unity" Held before the eventual cancellation of both the 2021 and 2022 tours due to the COVID-19 pandemic.
2022 Tour: "Journey" Features entire US Olympic team.

Cast
The original cast was Scott Hamilton, Dorothy Hamill, Toller Cranston, Rosalynn Sumners, Brian Pockar, Lea Ann Miller, Bill Fauver, Lisa Carey, Chris Harrison, Judy Blumberg and Michael Seibert.

Skaters who have toured with the show include:

  Jeremy Abbott
  Miki Ando  (Canada & Japan)
  Natalia Annenko & Genrich Sretenski
  Oksana Baiul
  Gary Beacom
  Elena Bechke & Denis Petrov
  Tanith Belbin & Ben Agosto
  Elena Berezhnaya & Anton Sikharulidze
  Shae-Lynn Bourne & Victor Kraatz
  Ryan Bradley
  Isabelle Brasseur & Lloyd Eisler
  Jason Brown
  Kurt Browning
  Jeffrey Buttle
  Maria Butyrskaya (Canada & Euro)
  Kitty Carruthers & Peter Carruthers
  Patrick Chan
  Karen Chen
  Nathan Chen
  Chen Lu
  Madison Chock & Evan Bates
  Josée Chouinard (Canada)
  Sasha Cohen
  Steven Cousins
  Alissa Czisny
  Gabrielle Daleman (Canada)
  Meryl Davis & Charlie White
  Marie-France Dubreuil & Patrice Lauzon (Canada)
  Meagan Duhamel & Eric Radford  (Canada)
  Jason Dungjen
  Polina Edmunds
  Todd Eldredge
  Joshua Farris
  Javier Fernández (Canada & Japan)
  Gracie Gold
  Ekaterina Gordeeva
  Ekaterina Gordeeva & Sergei Grinkov
  Christine Hough & Doug Ladret
  Madison Hubbell & Zach Donohue
  Sarah Hughes
  Lubov Iliushechkina & Dylan Moscovitch (Canada)
  Kyoko Ina & John Zimmerman
  Sinead Kerr & John Kerr
  Radka Kovaříková & René Novotný
  Anjelika Krylova & Oleg Ovsiannikov
  Ilia Kulik
  Stéphane Lambiel (Canada & Japan)
  Tara Lipinski
  Evan Lysacek
  Jenni Meno & Todd Sand
  Kimmie Meissner
  Mirai Nagasu
  Kimberly Navarro & Brent Bommentre
  Angela Nikodinov
  Brian Orser
  Kaetlyn Osmond  (Canada)
  Cynthia Phaneuf  (Canada)
  Susanna Rahkamo & Petri Kokko
  Adam Rippon 
  Jennifer Robinson
  Renée Roca & Gorsha Sur
  Joannie Rochette
  Lucinda Ruh
  Yuka Sato
  Jamie Salé & David Pelletier
  Emanuel Sandhu (Canada & Euro)
  Shawn Sawyer
  Kathleen Schmelz
  Xue Shen & Hongbo Zhao
  Maia Shibutani & Alex Shibutani
  Michael Slipchuk  (Canada)
  Elvis Stojko (Canada)
  Rosalynn Sumners
  Bradie Tennell
  Debi Thomas
  Jayne Torvill & Christopher Dean
  Jill Trenary
  Barbara Underhill & Paul Martini (Canada)
  Tessa Virtue & Scott Moir  (Canada & Japan)
  Ashley Wagner  
  Kaitlyn Weaver & Andrew Poje  (Canada)
  Michael Weiss
  Tracy Wilson & Rob McCall
  Katarina Witt
  Paul Wylie
  Kristi Yamaguchi
  Alexei Yagudin

Stars on Ice Europe
  Denise Biellmann
  Ruben Blommaert
  Nicole Bobek
  Maria Butyrskaya
  Margarita Drobiazko and Povilas Vanagas
  Barbara Fusar-Poli & Maurizio Margaglio
  Romain Gazave
  Andrei Griazev
  Stefan Lindemann
  Tatiana Navka & Roman Kostomarov
  Katie Orscher & Garrett Lucash
  Isabelle Pieman
  Susanna Pöykiö
  Jozef Sabovčík
  Irina Slutskaya
  Tatiana Totmianina & Maxim Marinin
  Kevin van der Perren
  Mandy Wötzel & Ingo Steuer

Stars on Ice Japan
  Shizuka Arakawa
  Mai Asada
  Mao Asada
  Philippe Candeloro
  Patrick Chan
  Nathan Chen
  Meagan Duhamel & Eric Radford
  Javier Fernández
  Yuzuru Hanyu
  Wakaba Higuchi
  Takeshi Honda
  Carolina Kostner
  Takahiko Kozuka
  Tatsuki Machida
  Evgenia Medvedeva
  Satoko Miyahara
  Takahito Mura
  Daisuke Murakami
  Kanako Murakami 
  Kana Muramoto & Chris Reed
  Yukari Nakano
  Nobunari Oda
  Kaetlyn Osmond
  Qing Pang & Jian Tong
  Evgeni Plushenko
  Cathy Reed & Chris Reed
  Maia Shibutani & Alex Shibutani
  Irina Slutskaya
  Adelina Sotnikova
  Miu Suzaki & Ryuichi Kihara
  Akiko Suzuki
  Daisuke Takahashi
  Narumi Takahashi & Mervin Tran
  Narumi Takahashi & Ryuichi Kihara
  Shoma Uno
  Tessa Virtue & Scott Moir
  Johnny Weir
  Alina Zagitova

Other ice shows named Stars on Ice

 Stars on Ice was also the name of an ice show put on at the Center Theatre in New York City in the early 1940s.  The show was produced by Arthur Wirtz and Sonja Henie. The original Broadway production ran for 827 performances.
 Stars on Ice was also a television series, broadcast from 1976 to 1981 on the CTV Television Network in Canada, hosted by Alex Trebek (1976–1980) and later, Doug Crosley (1980–1981).

References

 Hamilton, Scott (1999).  Landing It, .

External links 
 US Stars on Ice website
 Canadian Stars on Ice website
 Japan Stars on Ice website

Ice shows